Secretos en el jardín (lit: Secrets in the garden), also known as Secrets In The City, is a Chilean television series created by Julio Rojas and Matías Ovalle, that aired on Canal 13 from November 24, 2013, to June 9, 2014, starring Francisco Pérez-Bannen, Antonia Zegers, Francisca Lewin, Mario Horton and Blanca Lewin.

Plot

Cast

Main cast 
 Francisco Pérez-Bannen as Ramiro Opazo.
 Antonia Zegers as Magdalena Villanueva.
 Francisca Lewin as Raquel Lastra.
 Mario Horton as Javier Montes.
 Blanca Lewin as Bárbara Benoit.
 Cristián Campos as Hernán Jerez.
 Alejandro Goic as Carlos Alberto Cox.

Supporting characters 
 Daniela Ramírez as Sofia Ventura.
 Julio Milostich as Francisco O’Ryan.
 Néstor Cantillana as Juan Enrique Ramírez.
 Mónica Godoy as Carmen Pereira.
 Jaime Vadell as Klaus Cox.
 Edgardo Bruna as Aníbal Lastra.
 Claudio Arredondo as Braulio Hernández.
 Francisca Gavilán as Romina Retamal.
 Roberto Farías as Luis Gutiérrez.
 Camila Hirane as Rosa Sepúlveda.
 Cristóbal Tapia Montt as Sergio O’Ryan.
 Antonella Orsini as Dolores O’Ryan.
 Rodrigo Soto as Emilio Fuentes.
 Catalina González as Ana Carrasco.
 Daniel Antivilo as Pablo Aguirre.
 Paloma Mena as Maura Alberty.
 Felipe Ponce as Claudio Jaramillo.
 Edinson Díaz as Roberto Quiñones.
 Jesús Herrera as Juanito Ramírez.

Guest appearances 
 Daniela Lhorente as Luisa Cárdenas.
 Alejandro Trejo as Roberto Soto.
 Lucy Cominetti as Beatriz Urra.
 Pedro Vicuña as Darío.
 Isidora González as Fabiana Opazo.
 Héctor Aguilar as Ómar Raleff.
 Hernán Vallejo as Facundo Andrade.
 Francisca Castillo as Lorena.
 Alejandra Vega as Maritza.
 Daniel de la Vega as TV reporter.

Reception

Television ratings

References

External links 
 Official website 

2013 telenovelas
Chilean telenovelas
2013 Chilean television series debuts
2014 Chilean television series endings
Spanish-language telenovelas
Canal 13 (Chilean TV channel) telenovelas